The 2000–01 NCAA football bowl games concluded the 2000 NCAA Division I-A football season. In the third year of the Bowl Championship Series (BCS) era, Oklahoma defeated Florida State in the 2001 Orange Bowl, designated as the BCS National Championship Game for the 2000 season.

A total of 25 bowl games were played between December 20, 2000, and January 3, 2001, by 50 bowl-eligible teams. Two short-lived bowl games were established for the 2000–01 season: the galleryfurniture.com Bowl (dissolved after its 2005 iteration as the Houston Bowl), and the Silicon Valley Football Classic (dissolved after its 2004 iteration).

Non-BCS bowls

BCS bowls
Each of the games in the following table was televised by ABC.

Notes

References